Jerry Mason may refer to:

 Jerry Mason (singer) (born 1942), American singer, songwriter, guitar player, and entertainer
 Jerry Mason (footballer), English footballer